The following list is a discography of production by Swedish-American hip hop record producer Quincy Jones III. It includes a list of songs produced, co-produced and remixed by year, title, artist and album.

Production credits

Remixes

References 

Hip hop discographies
Production discographies
Albums produced by Quincy Jones III